Parti is a Hungarian surname. Notable people with the surname include:

 János Parti (1932–1998), Hungarian sprint canoeist
 Zoltán Parti (fl. 1970s), Hungarian sprint canoeist

Hungarian-language surnames